Thomas McManus may refer to

Tam McManus (Thomas Kelly McManus, born 1981), Scottish footballer
Thomas F. McManus, naval architect
Thomas J. McManus (1864–1926), New York politician
Tom McManus (American football) (born 1970), American footballer